The Northampton loop is a railway line serving the town of Northampton. It is a branch of the West Coast Main Line, deviating from the faster direct main line which runs to the west. The WCML is a four track line up to either end of the Loop: the 'up' and 'down' fast tracks take the direct route while the 'up' and 'down' slow tracks are diverted via Northampton railway station. Generally, fast express trains run via the direct line, while freight and slower passenger services run via the loop line. 

The southern interconnect between the Northampton loop and the direct London–Birmingham main line is at Hanslope Junction, just north of Milton Keynes. The lines continue to run alongside until the two routes diverge north of Roade at the northern end of Roade cutting. The loop line then runs north east for several miles until it reaches Northampton station. After Northampton, the line heads to the north-west for around twenty miles, until it re-joins the main line at Hillmorton Junction at Rugby, just east of Rugby station.

Services and operations
The majority of passenger services on the line are provided by West Midlands Trains using Class 350 electric multiple units. Class 319 units are used for peak-hour express services between Northampton and London Euston. The service consists of three 'semi fast' trains per hour between London Euston and Birmingham New Street. There is also an hourly local service between Northampton and Birmingham. Prior to December 2012 there was also a service to and from Crewe, but a few serve the loop line during morning and evenings and hourly on Sundays.

Avanti West Coast provide a small number of Class 390 Pendolino services to London at the extremes of the day. But nearly all Avanti West Coast trains use the direct main line. As of 2011, line speeds were expected to increase to  once signalling improvements are in place north of Northampton up to Rugby.

Long Buckby; the one other station on the line, is served by the London–Birmingham/Northampton–Birmingham services. The London–Crewe service does not stop at Long Buckby except on Sundays.

The line sees heavy freight traffic, as it is used by all freight trains on the southern part of the WCML. Many of these are container trains, with some serving the Daventry International Railfreight Terminal (DIRFT), which is between Northampton and Rugby (thus on the loop line).

History

When the London and Birmingham Railway (L&BR) was constructed in the 1830s, Northampton was by-passed, with the line running on high ground to the west via Kilsby Tunnel. Traditionally, this was said to have been because wealthy Northampton landowners objected to
having a railway run through their land to reach the town. However, an alternative view is that Northampton was by-passed because the gradients would have been too steep for the early locomotives of the 1830s to easily cope with. Robert Stephenson the engineer of the London and Birmingham Railway was determined to avoid gradients steeper than 1:330 (that is 1 foot of rising or falling gradient for every 330 feet of distance). As Northampton is located in the Nene Valley,  lower than Blisworth, the closest point the L&BR came, connecting the town would have required gradients significantly steeper than this.

This meant however that Northampton, despite being a large town, did not have direct rail links to London. A branch from the main line was built to Northampton in the early 1840s: the Northampton and Peterborough Railway, from Blisworth, which gave the town indirect rail links to London and Birmingham.

The successor to the L&BR, the London and North Western Railway (LNWR) decided to construct the loop line through Northampton in the 1870s. The LNWR obtained Parliamentary approval for the line in 1875, and commenced construction in 1877. The line was opened for goods throughout on 1 August 1881, for passengers between Rugby and Northampton on 1 December 1881, and for passengers between Northampton and Roade on 3 April 1882.

The loop line made use of the existing but small Northampton Castle railway station which occupied part of the site of the historic Northampton Castle. The station needed to be expanded as part of the works, this required the almost complete demolition of what remained of the Castle to make way for it.

Shortly after the completion of the loop line, the southern approach to Rugby station was remodelled, with a new flying junction built near Hillmorton, which allowed trains from the loop line to run into Rugby station without conflicting with trains on the fast lines.
 
The line was electrified along with the rest of the WCML during the 1960s in the wake of the BR 1955 Modernisation Plan.

The Daventry International Rail Freight Terminal (DIRFT); a major rail freight interchange, was opened in 1996 with a rail connection to the loop line, and has been expanded several times since.

Stations

The only stations that are currently operational on the route are Northampton and Long Buckby. Previously there were five stations on the loop line, but only these two survive. The three stations closed were:

 Kilsby and Crick (closed 1960)
 Long Buckby
 Althorp Park (closed 1960)
 Church Brampton (closed 1931)
 Northampton

Proposed future development
Warwickshire County Council has proposed a new station on the Northampton Loop Line called Rugby Parkway, which would be on the south-eastern outskirts of Rugby serving the Hillmorton area of the town, and the new housing development at Houlton. The purpose of this would be to accommodate the future expansion of the town. The station was originally planned to open in 2019.

As funding was not secured, this deadline was not met. Nevertheless, in July 2019, Warwickshire County Council's Draft Rail Strategy for 2019-2034 proposed that the station would be opened between 2019 and 2026, with the possibility that at some point additional platforms could be provided on the 'fast' West Coast Main Line lines, in addition to the slow lines via Northampton.

Infrastructure
The line is double track and electrified throughout.

Accidents and incidents
In January 1906, a young woman; 19 year old Lily Yolande Marie Rochaid was found dead in Crick Tunnel, having fallen from the train she was travelling on from London to Rugby. A search was called after the train arrived at Rugby and it was noticed that the door of the carriage was open and no-one was inside. The circumstances of her death were never fully explained.
Two very similar railway accidents occurred on the Northampton loop in 1967 and 1969. The 1967 incident was near the village of Milton Malsor between Roade and Hunsbury Hill tunnel and the other in 1969 near the northern end of Roade cutting.
On 20 March 1985, the body of 35 year old social worker Janet Maddocks was found beside the line to the north of Northampton station. Jack Roy, aged 15 at the time, was later convicted of murdering her and throwing her from a train.

References

 
 
 

Transport in Northampton
Rail transport in Northamptonshire
Railway lines in the East Midlands
Railway lines in the West Midlands (region)
Standard gauge railways in England